Suttonians Rugby Football Club is affiliated to the Irish Rugby Football Union. The men's 1st XV team plays in Division 1A of the Leinster League. The women's 1st XV, nicknamed 'Tribe', play in Division 1 of the women's All Ireland League.
The clubhouse and grounds are based at the JJ McDowell Memorial Grounds on Station Road, Sutton, Fingal. 
The Club fields five senior sides with underage teams from under 6 age grade up to under 20, men's and women's. 
Suttonians is one of only four Northside Dublin clubs to have played in the All Ireland Leagues (Clontarf, Skerries and Malahide being the others).

History

Beginning
The Hill of Howth overlooks the northern shores of Dublin Bay. It is situated on the Howth Peninsula and slopes down to the old village of Sutton.  In Sutton in September 1899 the club was founded as Sutton Rugby Football Club. It was largely made up of members of the Police Force and the Coast Guard. The Great War was responsible for the disbandment of the club and the scattering of its members. The club was re-formed in 1924 as Suttonians Rugby Football Club.

The famous 'tin shed' clubhouse, which was located at the main Howth Road entrance to the grounds, remained in use until a new clubhouse was built in the present location on Station Road in 1970/71, through the support of Jack McDowell.

Re-birth 
With little or no direct association to the old club a group of young men banded together in the summer of 1924 to reform the club with the new name of Suttonians Rugby Football Club with a membership of about eighteen. Local politician Senator Andrew Jameson provided financial assistance and assistance in the procurement of playing grounds from Howth Castle, off Saxe Lane, Sutton. Suttonians RFC became affiliated to the Leinster Branch of the Irish Rugby Football Union in 1927 and has since then taken part in branch competitions at all levels.

Colours 
By 1930 the membership had expanded to include over fifty players turning out in the club’s strip of the time which was a blue shirt with an emblazoned white star. This strip was abandoned in or about 1932/33 and the present colours of royal blue, white and emerald green were adopted. These colours were those worn by Jack McDowell's horse 'Caughoo' when it won the English Grand National in 1947.

Crest and motto
The club crest and motto (which include the mottoless Dublin and part of the St. Lawrence coats of arms) were adopted by the club at a general meeting held in the Royal Hotel Howth, presided over by W.H.S. Campbell, the President during the early 1950s. “Fág an Bealach” which translates from Irish as “Clear the Way”, was chosen as the club motto. This is also used as the war cry for the Royal Irish Fusiliers and Faugh A Ballagh.

Station Road
In 1934 the club moved from Saxe Lane to its present location at Station Road, Sutton. The recently excavated sand pit there was made available and an enormous effort on the part of its members turned it into a playing field. It remains the club’s main pitch to this day although it has been filled in. The first match played on it was against neighbouring Malahide RFC on 24 November 1934.

The 1930s
The affairs of the club during the first fifteen years were largely dominated by a number of personalities on the administration side. There were such names as Sen. Andrew Jameson (Club President from the reincarnation to 1941), Harry Patton (Club Chairman from 1925 to 1973) and Ray Watson (who acted as Club Secretary from 1931 to 1940). On the team sheets the names of Freddie Spencer, Malcolm O’Grady, Jack McDowell, Billy Campbell and Paddy Lavery regularly appeared. Under the captaincy of Jack McDowell the 1st XV were the beaten finalists in the Minor (nowadays referred to as Junior 2) League for the 1932/33 season.

The 1940s
The 1940s were years of great triumphs for Suttonians. The decade opened quietly but gradually a formidable team was welded together under the guidance of Seamus Henry. His ambition for the Club was achieving the impossible dream, winning the Metropolitan Cup (competed for annually by Dublin’s Junior 1 teams). This coveted trophy was then as now monopolized by Senior Clubs' 2nd XVs. For a Junior Club to win it the task was (and remains) very difficult; for a Minor Club to take home the cup an heroic effort was required. Hopes were high coming into the 1946/47 season.

1946/47 - the Metropolitan Cup
During the 1946/47 season the team was narrowly beaten in extra time in the Minor League final by UCD's 3rd XV, having overcome such names as Blackrock College, Terenure College, Old Belvedere, CYMS and Palmerston throughout the campaign. In the Metropolitan Cup competition Suttonians, growing in confidence and experience, disposed of Monkstown, UCD and Belvedere before overcoming Clontarf in a “local derby” Cup Final.

The 'Met Cup' had come to Sutton in fulfilment of a dream conceived by Seamus Henry and realised with the efforts of players like Tom Geary, Brendan McClancy, Walter Scott and Oliver Campbell - whose son graced the rugby fields of the world in more recent times - to name but a few. In that year the 1st XV played 22 matches, won 20, drew one and lost one, accumulating 191 points while conceding 59. No mean performance!

The 1950s
The success could only strengthen the club: they won Minor League titles in 1949/50 and again in 1951/52. It was after the second of these victories that the team was promoted to the ranks of Junior Rugby.

The 1960s
During the next decade the club went into decline with many players going to Senior Clubs and the loss of the top pitch. In 1964 the club put up the Spencer Memorial Cup (commemorating a former club captain who died as a result of an injury received while playing rugby). An annual competition was initiated, restricted to Metropolitan Clubs of Junior status or below.

The 1970s
In 1971 the new pavilion, situated at a new location on Station Road, was opened by Robert Ganly, President of the Leinster Branch of the IRFU. The Committee hoped this would redress the standing of the club in the area by providing better facilities. Foxfield Youth RFC arrived to train and practise at Sutton about this time. They won the McAuley Cup (U15s) in 1976 and shortly afterwards merged their identity with Suttonians enabling the club to boast a very strong Juvenile Section. This allowed the club to win the Harry Gale Cup (U19s) in 1978, the McAuley Cup in 1979 and the Culliton Cup (u18s) in 1987.

The 1980s
In 1981 under the captaincy of Mark Shatwell they won the Spencer Cup for the first time; the cup was brought to Sutton again in 1988 under the Captaincy of Dave Cassidy. In 1982 a second pitch adjoining Station Road was purchased. The clubhouse was extensively damaged in a fire at the start of the 1984 season, and was redesigned and rebuilt during the following season.

The 1990s
In the 1993/94 season the club won the Leinster League, the Spencer Cup and were finalists in the Metropolitan Cup. The club won the Leinster League during the 1995/96 season and was promoted to the then 4th Division of the All Ireland League. In 1997 the club won the 4th Division of the All Ireland League with a 100% record, one of only three teams to have ever achieved this in any division.

The 2000s
For the first time the club was involved in Division 3 playoffs after a creditable fourth-place finish during the 2004/05 season, losing out to runaway Division 3 winners Greystones. In the 2005/06 season Suttonians achieved the historic feat of gaining promotion to All Ireland League Division 2, progressing to the semi-final of the Leddin Finance Leinster Senior Cup, and competed in the inaugural All Ireland Cup as one of only five sides representing Leinster. The club finished thirteenth in their first season of AIL Division 2, having risen to the lofty heights of joint third at the Christmas break.

The 2010s
This new decade began with Suttonians finishing in ninth position of AIL Division 3. The team won all games bar the final match against newly promoted Midleton. 2010/11 was also notable for the emergence of a clutch of new young homegrown players.

Unfortunately this decade did not prolong the "Golden Era" for the Club, as it was relegated, first from the AIL to the Leinster League Division 1A, then to Division 1B. At the end of the 2016/17 season the Club avoided further humiliation by winning a Relegation Play-off against Carlow RFC and barely securing its place in the division. 
The following season heralded a new successful year, culminating in victory in a Promotion Play-off game against DLSP to gain access to Division 1A again. However the fortune of other Leinster clubs relegated from the AIL went against Suttonians, but the future looks better than it has been for many years with a strong coaching team and a united group of players. The 2018/19 season saw the club's Men's 1st XV win promotion to Leinster League 1A with 11 wins in 14 games and topping the table by seven points.

The decade also saw the emergence and success of women's rugby at the Club, with the Ladies 1st XV engaged in the Leinster Division 2 and narrowly missing winning the league in 2018. That same year however, the Ladies 1st XV won the Leinster Rugby Paul Flood Cup, disposing of three Division 1 teams along the way to reach the final. The 2018/19 has seen the Women's 1st XV win promotion to the 2019/20 All Ireland Women's league after winning the Leinster Women's division 2 emphatically with 14 wins from 14 matches and a 16 point difference to the second placed club. They won promotion to the AIL leagues with wins over established women's teams in a tough qualification process.

The 2020s 
The new decade began well with Suttonians managing to finish in the top half of the Division 1A table while beating the top two teams in the table in the final four games of the season. This followed two seasons cut short and ultimately suspended by the onset of Covid-19.

Players

Drawing on the local community, Suttonians has been for many years a 'parish' style club attracting members from the immediate surroundings and just beyond. Still featuring a majority of home-grown players, the club is known for its hospitality and has been home to a number of players from further afield, many of whom retain strong links with the club. Aaron Mauger plied his trade with the club for a season, before he broke into the professional ranks in New Zealand. Similarly, the club introduced Irish international Ian Keatley to the game of rugby.

The Club has a wealth of under-age Interprovincials and Internationals, including one Ladies under-age representative, and the latest being a Leinster Rugby Junior selection. Leinster Rugby academy player Jack Aungier who is a former Ireland u20's International played his rugby from Mini's all the way through to under age level . After a learning couple of years with the Leinster academy including some appearance with the senior team he moved to Connacht and scored a debut try for Connacht against Ulster in the Aviva Stadium in August 2020.

Records

Academy

Founded in the 2002/03 season, the Suttonians Academy was generated with the aim of identifying and working with elite players among the under 18 and under 20 age grades who have the potential and commitment to develop to AIL Division 1 standard. Specialist additional coaching in a variety of areas is provided to aid those players in their quest to improve the required skills. All players remain fully amateur and work or attend college during their time in the Academy. Every summer, two Academy players are sent to Durban, South Africa and spend the summer months attending the Academy of the Super Rugby franchise The Sharks to further their rugby education.

Youth section aka MY Suttonians

With a strong, vibrant Minis section (age 6-12) Suttonians' fledglings take to the pitches on Sunday mornings and some midweek evenings. Hard work invested by those in the club's MY Suttonians and coaches has seen the club grow strong in numbers with improved results at these ages. Over the years, Suttonians have fed at least as many high quality players into the schools system as any other nursery in the city. This, in many cases, has been damaging to the club with the rugby schools reaping the benefits of the hard work invested. A large number of Suttonians Minis have gone on to represent Leinster and Ireland at under-age level and often do not return to the nest, instead favouring the lure of AIL Division 1 rugby after leaving school. Players such as Aidan Kearney (Leinster and Ulster) who returned to play and coach with Suttonians, and in recent years Dave O'Brien (Leinster Academy and Ireland U20) and Ian Keatley (London Irish, Munster and Ireland U20) have taken this route. Former Leinster, Melbourne Rebels and Western Force hooker Tom Sexton started playing rugby in Suttonians' Minis set-up.

The Minis 'exodus' impacts hardest at Youths level (age 13-18) as Suttonians has been in a position where restocking in terms of numbers and quality has left the club and coaches with a hard task. Traditionally, some youths attending schools in the neighbourhood have filled the void by taking up the game afresh to play alongside those in local schools continuing through from Minis. The increase in popularity of the game in 'non-traditional' rugby areas has helped recruit larger numbers in recent years and it must be said that while recruitment at Youths level has been difficult for the club the potential to attract young talent from local, 'non-traditional' areas could surely be an area of huge, hitherto largely untapped, growth. The club employs a Youth Development Officer whose role is to introduce the game into new schools and propagate interest in the sport with the hope that some of these young players will join the club during or after school. St. Fintan's High School, winners of Leinster Schools Development Cup 2006/07, is a good example of the work being done by the club in the local community.

Teams

Senior 
1st XV 
 Leinster League Division 1A

2nd XV 
 Leinster Seconds League Division 1A
 Spencer Cup

3rd XV 
 Metro League Division 10

U20 XV 
 TBC

Women's XV 
 All Ireland League
 All Ireland Cup

Youth Teams
U19s to U6s
 Metro Area Leagues and Cups

Club presidents & captains

Presidents

Captains

Tours

A number of Suttonians players who happened to have had their boots with them played in Barcelona, Spain in 1960. This game was not officially recognised by the IRFU and therefore was not an official tour. The 'squad' were given "The Freedom of the City" at a civic reception.
Suttonians have enjoyed many successful tours abroad, soaking up the local culture while squeezing some rugby in when possible.
Tours to Kenya, Australia, Argentina, South Africa, Poland (where the 1st XV defeated the Polish National side), Munich and a Tri-Nations Scandinavian tour to name a few, have seen Suttonians travel around the globe.

Professional Players

Current players
  Jack Aungier
  Seán Cribbin (Ireland Sevens)
  Ian Keatley (full international)
  Peter Synnott

Former players
  Karl Cowman
  Aidan Kearney
  Aaron Mauger (full international)
  Tom Sexton

See also
Suttonians RFC Official Website
Follow SRFCs Tweets

References

Sutton, Dublin
Irish rugby union teams
Rugby clubs established in 1924
Rugby union clubs in Fingal